Sævik or Sævig is a small village in the municipality of Namsos in Trøndelag county, Norway. The village was the site of the old Sævik Church until the mid-1800s. The village is located about half-way between the villages of Klinga and Spillum, along the Norwegian County Road 17.

History
Sævik had a church and was for many years the seat of a sub-parish (sokn).  In the 16th century, Sævig was recorded as a part of Fosnes prestegjeld (parish).  From 1820, it was part of the prestegjeld of Overhalla (not the same as Overhalla municipality).  There were churches in Sævik, Vemundvik (from 1844), and in Namsos (from 1859).

In 1859, Namsos became a parish of its own. The parish of Sævik was split in 1859, so that the northern part (Vemundvik) remained with Overhalla, and Sævik became a parish of its own.

In May 1885, the parish changed its name from Sævig to Klingen since that's where the church was then located.

References

Villages in Trøndelag
Namsos